Honnecourt may refer to:

 Villard de Honnecourt, 13th century artist from Picardy, France
 Honnecourt-sur-Escaut, a commune in the Nord department of France
 Battle of Honnecourt, in 1642, during the Franco-Spanish War